The Mexican rivulus (Millerichthys robustus) is a species of killifish from the family Rivulidae which is endemic to Mexico where it is found in the Papaloapan and Coatzacoalcos River basins. It is the only known species in its genus, but its exact taxonomic position remains uncertain, as it has not been included in any phylogenetic study. This species was described by Robert Rush Miller and Carl Leavitt Hubbs as Rivulus robustus in 1974, it was reclassified in the monotypic genus Millerichthys in 1995, the generic name honouring Robert Rush Miller.

References

Rivulidae
Monotypic fish genera
Endemic fish of Mexico
Freshwater fish of Mexico
Fish described in 1974
Taxa named by Robert Rush Miller
Taxa named by Carl Leavitt Hubbs